The 2010 Danmark Rundt was a men's road bicycle race held from 4 to 8 August 2010. Danish rider Jakob Fuglsang of Team Saxo Bank captured the overall title. This was the third Danmark Rundt victory for Fuglsang, the most in the race's history. It was the 20th edition of the men's stage race, which was established in 1985.

Schedule
All stages were held within Denmark.

Teams
15 teams were invited to the 2010 Danmark Rundt: 4 teams were from the UCI ProTeams, 6 were UCI Professional Continental Teams and 5 were UCI Continental Teams.

Stages

Stage 1: Holstebro–Holstebro (175 km)
The 2010 Danmark Rundt started in Holstebro. It was a flat stage and it ended in a mass sprint. Some of the favorites crashed a few kilometres from the finish because of heavy rain.

Route: Holstebro–Ulfborg–Thorsminde–Lemvig–Struer–Holstebro ending with 1 lap of 4.8 km.

Stage 2: Vildbjerg–Randers (170 km)
The second stage was a flat stage with some small hills, but perfect for a sprint finish.

Route: Vildbjerg–Herning–Ikast–Karup–Viborg–Bjerringbro–Randers

Stage 3: Hadsten–Vejle (185 km)
The third stage was the king stage of 2010 Post Danmark Rundt.

Route: Hadsten–Hammel–Gjern–Silkeborg–Yding Skovhøj–Uldum–Vejle

Stage 4: Nyborg–Odense (105 km)
A short sprinters stage, with the race moving to Funen.

Route: Nyborg–Kerteminde–Munkebo–Langeskov–Odense

Stage 5: Middelfart (19,4 km)
The fifth stage was the only individual time trial in the 2011 race. It took place around Middelfart on Funen.

Stage 6: Høng–Rudersdal (185 km)
The last stage followed the same route was the 2011 UCI World Championship.

Route: Høng–Dianalund–Merløse–Skibby–Frederikssund–Farum–Rudersdal

Classification leadership 

Danmark Rundt, 2010
2010 in Danish sport
Danmark Rundt